The 1981 Gent–Wevelgem was the 43rd edition of the Gent–Wevelgem cycle race and was held on 8 April 1981. The race started in Ghent and finished in Wevelgem. The race was won by Jan Raas of the TI–Raleigh team.

General classification

References

Gent–Wevelgem
1981 in road cycling
1981 in Belgian sport
April 1981 sports events in Europe
1981 Super Prestige Pernod